Bilateral diplomatic relations exist between Ukraine and Armenia. Diplomatic relations were established on December 25, 1991. Currently, Ukraine has the 5th largest Armenian community in the world. The Embassy of Armenia in Kyiv opened in 1993. The Embassy of Ukraine in Yerevan opened in 1996. The current Ambassador of Armenia to Ukraine is Andranik Manukyan. The current Ambassador of Ukraine to Armenia is Ivan Khukhta.

Economic cooperation 
Ukraine exports to Armenia include meat, dairy products, vegetables, and cereals. Armenia exports to Ukraine include electrotechnical products, alcoholic beverages, and mineral waters. For 9 months in 2015, the trade turnover between the countries amounted to 94.2 million US dollars, while the trade in goods amounted to 76.7 million dollars.

Cultural ties
Lviv is home to the Armenian Catholic Church in Ukraine which since "Soviet liberation" of Lviv, its see remains "vacant". Since 1997, Lviv also became a center of Ukrainian eparchy (diocese) of the Armenian Apostolic Church (Armenian Church).

The city of Armyansk, originally as Ermeni Bazzar, is named after the Crimean Armenian community.

Ambassadors

Ambassadors of Ukraine in Armenia 
 Aleksander Bozhko (1996–2001)
 Volodymyr Tyahlo (February 2, 2002 – June 2005)
 Aleksander Bozhko (June 2005 – July 22, 2010)
 Ivan Khukhta (July 22, 2010 – present)

Ambassadors of Armenia in Ukraine 
 Andranik Manukyan (April 26, 2010 – August 2, 2018)
 Tigran Seiranian (December 28, 2018 – June 1, 2021)
 Vladimir Karapetyan (June 1, 2021 – present)

State visits

Diplomacy 

Republic of Armenia
Kyiv (Embassy)

Republic of Ukraine
Yerevan (Embassy)

See also 
 Foreign relations of Armenia
 Foreign relations of Ukraine
 Armenians in Ukraine
 Ukrainians in Armenia
 Armenia–Russia relations

References 

 
Ukraine
Bilateral relations of Ukraine